Sailing Around the World is the 21st album release from the Australian children's music group the Wiggles. It was released in 2005 by Roadshow Entertainment.

Track listing
 Sailing Around the World Intro
 Sailing Around the World
 Hula Hula Hula (Nothing Could be Cooler) Intro
 Hula Hula Hula (Nothing Could be Cooler)
 San Francisco Trolley Car Intro
 San Francisco Trolley Car
 Agapame Tin Athena (We Love Athens) Intro
 Agapame Tin Athena (We Love Athens)
 Elbow to Elbow Intro
 Elbow to Elbow
 London Town Intro
 London Town
 Sicily (I Want to Go) Intro
 Sicily (I Want to Go)
 Here We Go Mexico City! Intro
 Here We Go Mexico City!
 Goldfish Intro
 Goldfish
 The Pennsylvania Polka Intro
 The Pennsylvania Polka
 The Barrel Polka Intro
 Roll Out The Barrel (The B.Barrel Polka)
 Mop Mop Intro
 Mop Mop
 Brisbane Intro
 Brisbane
 Sydney Barcarolle Intro
 Sydney Barcarolle
 Goodbye
 The Captain's Wavy Walk

Personnel

The Wiggles
Murray Cook - bass, vocals
Jeff Fatt - keyboard, vocals
Anthony Field - guitar, vocals
Greg Page - vocals

The Manzillas
Craig Abercrombie
Brett Clarke
Ryan De Saulnier
Sam Moran
Paul Paddick
Mark Punch

Additional Personnel
Steve Blau - keyboard
John Field, Mark Punch - guitar
Robin Gist - guitar, mixing, mastering
Tony Henry - drums
Dominic Lindsay - brass, percussion, keyboard
Chris Lupton - bass
Fernando Moguel - guitar, vocals
Fernandito Moguel - vocals
Julio Moguel - vocals

Video

A video was produced with many of the songs from the album. The videos were also used in the broadcast for "The Wiggles Show" (series 4 and 5 of their TV shows). Some of the music videos were produced as animation.

Song list
 "Sydney Barcarolle"
 "Goldfish"
 "Here Come the Chicken"
 "London Town"
 "Agapame Tin Athena (We Love Athens)"
 "The Captain's Wavy Walk"
 "Sailing Around the World"
 "Sicily (I Want to Go)"
 "Mop Mop"
 "Let's Go! We're Riding in the Big Red Car"
 "Elbow to Elbow"
 "San Francisco Trolley Car"
 "Fly Through the Sky"
 "Here We Go Mexico City"
 "The Barrel Polka"

Release
 Australia: 1 September 2005

Cast
The cast as presented on the videos:

 The Wiggles are
 Murray Cook
 Jeff Fatt
 Anthony Field
 Greg Page

Additional Cast
 Captain Feathersword: Paul Paddick
 Dorothy the Dinosaur: Lyn Stuckey
 Henry the Octopus: Kristy Talbot
 Wags the Dog: Lucy Stuart

Notes

References

External links

2005 albums
2005 video albums
The Wiggles albums
The Wiggles videos
Australian children's musical films